Hon. Bezaleel Taft Jr. was born in Uxbridge, Worcester County, Massachusetts on September 8, 1780 and died in Uxbridge, at age 65 on July 16, 1846. He was a State Senator and Massachusetts politician.

Early life
Bazaleel Taft Jr. was the son of Bezaleel Taft Sr. and Sarah Richardson Taft. His father had served as a soldier in the Revolutionary War. He was educated at Harvard, and was married twice. He was married to Margaret Stoddard Spring and then to Hannah Spring.

Career

Bezaleel Taft Jr. was a graduate of Harvard University and Harvard Law School in Cambridge. He returned to Uxbridge to practice law next door to his father Bezaleel Taft Sr. He followed his father's footsteps, and his grandfather Josiah by serving as a legislator. Hon. Bezaleel Taft Jr. had a long and distinguished career of public service as a state legislator, having served in the Massachusetts General Court and in the state Senate in the 1800s.

Historic home, "Elmshade"

In 1807, Bezaleel Taft Sr. built the "Elmshade" home at 195 South Main Street as a gift for Bezaleel Taft Jr after his son graduated from Harvard Law School. The son was practicing law, so a brick law office was also built. Bezaleel Taft Jr. was elected multiple times as a State Senator and a representative to the Massachusetts General Court, and served on the State Executive Council. He was President of the Blackstone National Bank for nearly 20 years and was a bank founder. Five generations of Taft's lived in "Elmshade". A number of them had powerful political and legal careers, including George S. Taft. George was Bezaleel Jr's son, a lawyer, District Attorney, and private secretary to U.S. Senator George Hoar. George's influence may have led to the Lincoln Square, Worcester Court House being erected. A family reunion at "Elmshade", in 1874, was likely attended by a young future US President, William Howard Taft.  The historic home is listed under the List of Registered Historic Places in Uxbridge.

Family roots and public service
Bezaleel Taft Jr. and his father were descendants of Robert Taft Sr, the first American Taft, who homesteaded in this town in 1680. Bezaleel Taft Jr. was the great great grandson of Robert Taft Sr. His grandmother, Lydia Chapin Taft, was America's First Woman Voter. His grandfather, Captain Josiah Taft, had fought in the French and Indian War. His father was a soldier and a Captain in the Worcester 9th Company, in the American Revolutionary War. The famous Taft family in the USA, began here with Robert Taft Sr. and among its descendants includes President Taft. Many members of the Taft family have been prominent in State and national politics, having served as judges, legislators, and in Federal Executive and Judicial positions. Bezaleel Taft's grandfather and father also served in the Massachusetts General Court, his grandfather under Colonial rule, and his father, under the new United States.

Honors and memberships
Elected a member of the American Antiquarian Society in 1820.

Death and afterwards
Bezaleel Taft Jr. died 16 Jul 1846 at Uxbridge, at age 65, just seven years after his father died. His cause of death is listed as "Consumption" in the Uxbridge vital records.  His many children carried on the honorable family name. Five generations of this branch of the Taft family served in the Massachusetts legislature, executive branch and government service including his son George Spring Taft, who served as a secretary to United States Senator George Frisbie Hoar from Massachusetts. A young William Howard Taft may have heard his father, Alphonso Taft, deliver a passionate oratory on this history of the Taft family and its roots in Uxbridge, at Bazaleel Taft Jr's "Elmshade" during one of the famous Taft family reunions. "Bazaleel Taft Jr. House and Law Office" is today listed on the National Register of Historic Places.

See also
Taft family
List of Registered Historic Places in Uxbridge, Massachusetts

Notes

Taft family
1780 births
1846 deaths
Harvard Law School alumni
People from Uxbridge, Massachusetts
Massachusetts state senators
Members of the American Antiquarian Society
19th-century American politicians